Notts County are the oldest club in the Football League and the 2010–11 season was their 122nd year in The Football League. After a successful season in League Two, the club gained promotion to League One following a win against Morecambe on 17 April 2010 and were crowned as League Two champions after a 5–0 win at already relegated Darlington ten days later. Manager Steve Cotterill left the club at the end of the season, and was replaced by Craig Short. Short was sacked on 26 October 2010, and replaced by Paul Ince. Ince left the club in April 2011, and was replaced by Martin Allen.

Season review

Kits
Nike continues as the shirt designer and Lorien Connect is the new shirt sponsor. Nike have gone for another traditional Notts County style shirt, with black and white stripes, however the arm only contains one strip which is on the underside of the kit. The Shirt Sponsor is given an aqua blue and burgundy colouring whilst the Nike logo is red.

Events
 – Craig Short is named as manager of Notts County, he signed a three-year contract.
 – Lee Hughes signs a new deal to keep up at the club till 2012.
 – Neal Bishop signs a new two-year deal keeping him at Meadow Lane till 2012.
 – Notts County are cleared by HM Revenue & Customs. They have now paid all money owed to HMRC.
 – Notts County take former Huddersfield Town defender Krystian Pearce on trial and he will travel to Austria with the team.
 – Nottingham council say they will assess the capacity of Meadow Lane.
 – Carl Heggs is appointed as new chief scout.
 – The Co-Operative Motor Group has signed a one-year agreement to become official partners of Notts County, also becoming car suppliers for the club.
 – Notts County sack Craig Short and Dave Kevan.
 – Former Milton Keynes Dons and Blackburn Rovers manager, Paul Ince is appointed manager.
 – Alex Rae is appointed as assistant manager.
 – Coach Tommy Johnson leaves Notts County.
 – Paul Ince resigns as manager, after losing 5 games in a row. Carl Heggs is installed as caretaker manager.
 – Barnet manager, Martin Allen becomes new manager of Notts County.

Pre-season
In their first week of pre-season, Notts County travelled to Austria to play SV Austria Salzburg, who they beat 2–1. Graeme Lee scored in the eight minute with Ben Davies claiming the assist. New signing Ben Burgess could have them put them 2–0 up but hit it wide, then Lee Hughes hit the cross bar. At half-time Luke Rodgers, Karl Hawley and new keeper Stuart Nelson came on to replace Hughes, Burgess and new no.1 Rob Burch. 27 seconds later County were 2–0 up with Luke Rodgers scoring. In the 50th minute Wührer scored for Salzburg. Five trialist came on including Krystian Pearce and Mansour Assoumani also new signing John Spicer made his debut. Notts County continued their tour of Austria, playing Polish team Arka Gdynia, Denis Glavina scored just before half-time to give the Polish team the lead and the win. Notts County's first home pre-season game was against Premier League outfit Stoke City, the final score was 0–0 with the Magpies impressing the home crowd. Notts County impressed again at Meadow Lane with a 2–1 win over Championship outfit Cardiff City, Lee Hughes scored a double before the break to put County 2–0 up and near the hour mark Scottish international, Ross McCormack pulled one back for the Bluebirds. Notts County put up a hard performance against Championship side Sheffield United, United took the lead in the 87th minute through a Ched Evans strike.

League One
Notts County begin their League One season with 3–0 defeats to both Huddersfield Town and Oldham Athletic, keeping them bottom of the table. County notched their first league win of the season against newly promoted Dagenham & Redbridge, and followed it with a hard-fought 3–3 away draw against Bournemouth. The next home league game marked the Meadow Lane centenary, and the team won 4–0 against Yeovil Town. Notts lost their next match to Charlton Athletic, 1–0, with the Addicks scoring the winning goal in the final five minutes, but responded with a 3–2 win over Leyton Orient at home. After losing their next league match 2–1 at Bristol Rovers, County recorded a midweek 3–2 away win against Peterborough United in a bad-tempered affair which saw players and officials involved in a fracas on the pitch. The following Saturday, Notts lost 2–0 at home to Sheffield Wednesday and had a player dismissed for the third consecutive league game. Carlisle United were the next side to defeat County. Bouncing back with a win over Plymouth Argyle and then consecutive losses to Colchester United and Southampton. Exeter City and Tranmere Rovers extended Notts County's losing run to 4 games before Lee Hughes scored the only goal in a win over Swindon Town. Notts County had their game with Brentford called off because of a frozen pitch. However, their luck had changed the following game, beating Milton Keynes Dons 2–0, this was followed by a 1–1 draw with Plymouth and consecutive wins against Walsall and Hartlepool United. Southampton then drew with Notts County, this was followed by 1–0 defeat to Carlisle United and 1–1 draws with Hartlepool United and Walsall. Exeter beat Notts County 2–0 and then Colchester United lost 2–0 to County, this was followed with a win over Charlton Athletic and a draw against Brentford. Two defeats by two promotion candidates, Leyton Orient and Peterborough United, followed before bouncing back with a 1–0 win over Sheffield Wednesday. County then suffered three consecutive 1–0 defeats to the hands of Rochdale, Bristol Rovers and league-leaders Brighton & Hove Albion. Defeats against Huddersfield Town, Oldham Athletic. Rochdale, Dagenham & Rebridge, Yeovil Town and Bournemouth all followed. Notts County finally ended their club-record nine game losing streak in the league when they beat fellow strugglers Tranmere Rovers 1–0 away. This was followed by a 2–1 win over Swindon Town, where County had to come back from one goal down. A draw with Brentford meant that the team were still not safe from relegation to League Two, and County failed again to secure safety after a 2–1 defeat to Milton Keynes Dons. They did however secure their league one safety on the final day of the season thanks to a 1–1 draw at home to league one champions Brighton & Hove Albion

Standings

Pld = Matches played; W = Matches won; D = Matches drawn; L = Matches lost; F = Goals for; A = Goals against; GD = Goal difference; Pts = Points

Results summary

Result Round by Round

FA Cup
Notts County began their campaign against non-league side Gateshead, which they won 2–0 sending them through to the 2nd round. Notts County were drawn against League One rivals Bournemouth, however the fixture was postponed twice due to the weather, but it finally took place on 14 December, where County won 3–1. This was followed by a 2–1 over Premier League side Sunderland. They were drawn against another Premier League, this time it was big spender Manchester City at Meadow Lane, the final result was 1–1, resulting in a replay at the City of Manchester Stadium where they were defeated 5–0.

League Cup
Notts County were drawn away to Plymouth Argyle in the first round, with John Spicer getting the only goal of the game to put County through to round two. Notts beat Watford 2–1 away in the second round but were knocked out of the tournament after losing 4–2 after extra time away at Wolves in round three.

Squad

Statistics
As of end of season

}

 *Indicates player left during the season

Disciplinary record

Transfers

In

Loans In

Out

Loans Out

Contract Extensions

Fixtures & Results

Pre-season

League One

FA Cup

Football League Cup

Football League Trophy

Backroom staff

See also
Notts County F.C. seasons

References

Notts County F.C. seasons
Notts County